Syed Akbar Hussain  (Urdu: سید اکبر زیدی) is a Pakistani political economist, academic and author. He is currently serving as the Executive Director of the Institute of Business Administration (IBA) in Karachi.

Early life and career
Zaidi is from a Muhajir Shia family in Karachi. He received his Bachelors in Economics from the University College London in 1977–80. Then, he completed his Masters in Social Planning of Developing Countries from the London School of Economics in 1981–82. For further studies, he went to the University of Cambridge from where he completed his doctorate degree.

Academic career
Prior to his current role, Zaidi was a faculty member at the IBA, as well as at Columbia University, the University of Oxford, and Johns Hopkins University. Zaidi has frequently provided commentary on Pakistan's economic growth and challenges, and their political implications. His areas of expertise in addition to the political economy include development, history and social sciences.

Publications
Zaidi has a teaching and research background spanning over 35 years, during which he published several academic papers and books. He has authored works and monographs such as Issues in Pakistan's Economy, Military, Civil Society and Democratisation in Pakistan, Pakistan's Economic and Social Development: The Domestic, Regional and Global Context and New Perspectives on Pakistan’s Political Economy — State, Class and Social Change among others.

References

Living people
Year of birth missing (living people)
Academics of the University of Oxford
Alumni of the University of Cambridge
Alumni of University College London
Alumni of the London School of Economics
Columbia University faculty
Academic staff of the Institute of Business Administration, Karachi
Johns Hopkins University faculty
Pakistani economists
Pakistani political scientists
Political economists
Executive Directors of the Institute of Business Administration, Karachi